Comberbach  is a civil parish and small village in the unitary authority of Cheshire West and Chester and the ceremonial county of Cheshire, England, between Northwich and Warrington. The population of the civil parish taken at the 2011 census was 953.  The village has a new memorial hall (partly Lottery Funded), a bowling club, one pub - the Spinner and Bergamot, (the Drum and Monkey closed in 2013) - and a post office/village shop. There is a county primary school, a Methodist chapel and an old-fashioned red phone box.

Cartoonist John Geering, the artist behind Bananaman, lived here.

Comberbach Mummers perform the traditional Soulcaking Play (a form of mummers play), from 31 October for two weeks.  It restarted in the mid-1980s. The mummers meet most Thursday evenings in The Spinner and Bergamot pub.

See also

Listed buildings in Comberbach

References

External links 

 Comberbach Website
 Comberbach Mummers Website

Villages in Cheshire
Civil parishes in Cheshire